Alpine Air Express is an American airline based in Provo, Utah, USA. It operates scheduled air passenger and cargo services on over 100 routes throughout Colorado, Minnesota, Montana, Nebraska, North Dakota, South Dakota, Wyoming, Idaho, and Utah. Its main base is the Provo Municipal Airport.
At one point also, Alpine Air Express was a passenger airline.

History 
The airline was established in 1971. It originally operated scheduled passenger and cargo services, aircraft maintenance and a flight school, but now concentrates on cargo and passenger services. The airline tried to establish Alpine Air Chile, in an attempt to enter Chile's air freight market. The project was not successful and was discontinued in 2005, with three Beechcraft 1900C being re-integrated into the US fleet.

While Alpine Air was performing scheduled passenger operations in the 1980s and 1990s, it served the following cities in Utah, Colorado, and Nevada:

 Blanding, UT
 Cedar City, UT
 Delta, UT
 Duchesne, UT
 Ely, NV
 Grand Junction, CO
 Green River, UT
 Manti, UT
 Moab, UT
 Monroe, UT
 Monticello, UT
 Mt. Pleasant, UT
 Nephi, UT
 Price, UT
 Provo, UT
 Richfield, UT
 Roosevelt, UT
 Salina, UT
 Salt Lake City, UT
 St. George, UT
 Vernal, UT

Some cities were served by Scenic Aviation and Castle Valley Aviation, on-demand charter services operating on behalf of Alpine Air.

Fleet 
The Alpine Air Express fleet includes the following aircraft.
Raytheon Beech 1900C
Raytheon Beech 1900D
Beechcraft Model 99
Beechcraft Super King Air
In April 2020 Alpine Air Express acquired the assets of the defunct Great Lakes Airlines, including 25 Beechcraft 1900 and two Embraer EMB 120 Brasilia which are to be converted to cargo planes.

Incidents 

In October 1992, an Alpine Air PA-42 deviated off course and crashed into a mesa in Grand Junction, Colorado, while operating as an airtaxi flight. There were three fatalities: the pilot and two passengers.

August 2004 – While operating a Billings to Kalispell, Montana, flight for the US Postal Service, the Beech 99 crashed into Big Baldy mountain, located near Great Falls. Two crewmembers died.

January 2008—An Alpine Air Raytheon Beech 1900 crashed into the Pacific Ocean on a cargo flight between Honolulu International Airport and Lihue Intl in Hawaii. This crash claimed one life: the pilot of the aircraft.

May 2008—Upon departure from Billings, ATC instructed the Beech 1900C to turn left. The Part 135 cargo plane slowly turned right and crashed into a warehouse nearby.  Witnesses say the plane was inverted prior to the crash which claimed the life of the single pilot on board.

In February 2010, a cargo door came unlatched on an airborne Alpine Air Express Beech 99 carrying mail from Billings, to Kalispell, Montana, at about 1:30 a.m. Because the door is located below the plane’s airstream, even when open it wouldn’t compromise the ability to fly and land the plane.

References

External links
 

Cargo airlines of the United States
Airlines established in 1972
Companies based in Provo, Utah
1972 establishments in Utah
Airlines based in Utah